Jacob Lackéll (born 5 July 2001) is a Swedish footballer who plays for IFK Eskilstuna.

References

External links
Jacob Lackéll at SvFF
Jacob Lackéll at Lagstatistik]

Living people
2001 births
Association football midfielders
Swedish footballers
IFK Eskilstuna players
AFC Eskilstuna players
Örebro SK players
Eskilstuna City FK players
Allsvenskan players